KWKD-LD, virtual and UHF digital channel 28, is a low-power Daystar Owned-and-operated television station licensed to Wichita, Kansas.

On March 26, 2006, the station was granted a construction permit to begin converting operations to digital television. Upon completion, the station was to broadcast at 15 kW on channel 38.

A deal was reached by the station's previous owner, Trinity Broadcasting Network, to sell the station to Word of God Fellowship, owner of Daystar, on March 19, 2010.

On July 13, 2021, following the FCC requirements for Low-power television stations to shut-off their analog signals, the then-KWKD-LP shut off their analog signal and replaced it with a digital signal. The callsign was also changed to KWKD-LD on July 27, 2021 to reflect this.

References

External links
Official Site
RabbitEars TV Query for KWKD

Television stations in Kansas
Television channels and stations established in 1989
1989 establishments in Kansas
Low-power television stations in the United States